The East Bay Times is a daily broadsheet newspaper based in Walnut Creek, California, United States, owned by the Bay Area News Group (BANG), a subsidiary of Media News Group, that serves Contra Costa and Alameda counties, in the East Bay region of the San Francisco Bay Area. It was founded as the Contra Costa Times, and took its current name in 2016 when it was merged with other sister papers in the East Bay.  Its oldest merged title is the Oakland Tribune founded in 1874.

History 
The original Contra Costa Times was founded by Dean Lesher in 1947, and served central Contra Costa County, especially Walnut Creek. However, Lesher began expanding by purchasing weekly newspapers in neighboring communities, as well as two eastern Contra Costa daily papers, the Antioch Ledger and the Pittsburg Post-Dispatch. Originally the weekly newspapers were free for shoppers, but Lesher gradually converted the papers to "controlled circulation" in 1962, an aggressive and expensive new strategy that called for free delivery of a copy to every household while asking readers to voluntarily buy subscriptions. Ultimately, the weeklies were converted into zoned daily editions called the West County Times, serving Richmond, El Cerrito, and western Contra Costa County; the San Ramon Valley Times, serving the suburbs of the San Ramon Valley south of Walnut Creek; and the Valley Times serving Livermore and the suburbs of eastern Alameda County. The two East Contra Costa dailies were merged into a single edition, the Ledger-Dispatch, which gradually faded away, first being reduced to a thrice-weekly insert in the Contra Costa Times, then being replaced outright by the East County Times.

Corporate ownership 
Lesher died May 13, 1993. On August 29, 1995, his widow Margaret sold the privately held company to the Knight Ridder newspaper chain for $360 million. Knight Ridder was later purchased by the Sacramento-based McClatchy Company in June 2006 in a deal valued at $4.5 billion. The deal was contingent on McClatchy selling off 12 of the 32 newspapers it had just purchased, including the Contra Costa Times.

On April 26, 2006, it was announced that MediaNews Group (now Digital First Media), then headed by William Dean Singleton, would purchase four of the "orphan 12", including the Contra Costa Times and San Jose Mercury News, for $1 billion. Although that transaction was completed on August 2, 2006, a lawsuit claiming antitrust violations by MediaNews and the Hearst Corporation had also been filed in July 2006. The suit, which sought to undo the purchase of the four newspapers, was scheduled to go to trial on April 30, 2007. While extending until that date a preliminary injunction preventing collaboration of local distribution and national advertising sales by the two media conglomerates, U.S. District Judge Susan Illston on December 19, 2006, expressed doubt over the legality of the purchase. On April 25, 2007, days before the trial was scheduled to begin, the parties reached a settlement in which MediaNews Group preserved its acquisitions.

As part of a reorganization announced in 2011, the Contra Costa Times was slated to be merged with the East County Times, San Ramon Valley Times, Tri-Valley Herald and San Joaquin Herald. However, BANG announced on October 27, 2011, that it would retain the Contra Costa Times and East County Times mastheads and only combine the Tri-Valley Herald, San Joaquin Herald, and San Ramon Valley Times under a new Tri-Valley Times masthead, reducing the number of mastheads from five to three.

On April 5, 2016, the three remaining Times editions were merged along with the company's other newspaper in the East Bay, the Oakland Tribune, which it had owned since 1992. The combined paper was named the East Bay Times.

In 2017, the staff of the East Bay Times was awarded the Pulitzer Prize for Breaking News Reporting, for "relentless coverage of the Ghost Ship warehouse fire, which killed 36 people at a warehouse party, and for reporting after the tragedy that exposed the city's failure to take actions that might have prevented it".

Community weeklies
The East Bay Times publishes the following community weeklies:
Alameda Journal
Berkeley Voice
The Journal (El Cerrito)
The Montclarion
The Piedmonter
Oakland Tribune
Daily Review
The Argus
Concord Transcript
Walnut Creek Journal
East County News

References

External links 

 
 California Newspaper Hall of Fame, Dean Lesher

Mass media in Contra Costa County, California
Daily newspapers published in the San Francisco Bay Area
MediaNews Group publications
Publications established in 1947
Mass media in Richmond, California
1947 establishments in California
Pulitzer Prize-winning newspapers